Lactifluus aurantioruber is a species of mushroom in the family Russulaceae. It originally described by McNabb as Lactifluus clarkeae var. aurantioruber in 1971, named for its reddish-orange colour. Jerry A. Cooper raised this variety to species-rank in 2021, thus acquiring the name Lactifluus aurantioruber. The type locality is Tongariro  National  Park, New Zealand.

See also 
 
 List of Lactifluus species

References

External links 
 

Fungi described in 2021
Fungi of New Zealand
Lactifluus